This is an index to pages listing Argentine films ordered by year of release. For an A-Z list, see :Category:Argentine films.

1897-1929
List of Argentine films before 1930

1930s
List of Argentine films of 1930
List of Argentine films of 1931
List of Argentine films of 1932
List of Argentine films of 1933
List of Argentine films of 1934
List of Argentine films of 1935
List of Argentine films of 1936
List of Argentine films of 1937
List of Argentine films of 1938
List of Argentine films of 1939

1940s
List of Argentine films of 1940
List of Argentine films of 1941
List of Argentine films of 1942
List of Argentine films of 1943
List of Argentine films of 1944
List of Argentine films of 1945
List of Argentine films of 1946
List of Argentine films of 1947
List of Argentine films of 1948
List of Argentine films of 1949

1950s
List of Argentine films of 1950
List of Argentine films of 1951
List of Argentine films of 1952
List of Argentine films of 1953
List of Argentine films of 1954
List of Argentine films of 1955
List of Argentine films of 1956
List of Argentine films of 1957
List of Argentine films of 1958
List of Argentine films of 1959

1960s
List of Argentine films of 1960
List of Argentine films of 1961
List of Argentine films of 1962
List of Argentine films of 1963
List of Argentine films of 1964
List of Argentine films of 1965
List of Argentine films of 1966
List of Argentine films of 1967
List of Argentine films of 1968
List of Argentine films of 1969

1970s
List of Argentine films of 1970
List of Argentine films of 1971
List of Argentine films of 1972
List of Argentine films of 1973
List of Argentine films of 1974
List of Argentine films of 1975
List of Argentine films of 1976
List of Argentine films of 1977
List of Argentine films of 1978
List of Argentine films of 1979

1980s
List of Argentine films of 1980
List of Argentine films of 1981
List of Argentine films of 1982
List of Argentine films of 1983
List of Argentine films of 1984
List of Argentine films of 1985
List of Argentine films of 1986
List of Argentine films of 1987
List of Argentine films of 1988
List of Argentine films of 1989

1990s
List of Argentine films of 1990
List of Argentine films of 1991
List of Argentine films of 1992
List of Argentine films of 1993
List of Argentine films of 1994
List of Argentine films of 1995
List of Argentine films of 1996
List of Argentine films of 1997
List of Argentine films of 1998
List of Argentine films of 1999

2000s
List of Argentine films of 2000
List of Argentine films of 2001
List of Argentine films of 2002
List of Argentine films of 2003
List of Argentine films of 2004
List of Argentine films of 2005
List of Argentine films of 2006
List of Argentine films of 2007
List of Argentine films of 2008
List of Argentine films of 2009

2010s
List of Argentine films of 2010
List of Argentine films of 2011
List of Argentine films of 2012
List of Argentine films of 2013
List of Argentine films of 2014
List of Argentine films of 2015
List of Argentine films of 2016
List of Argentine films of 2017
List of Argentine films of 2018
List of Argentine films of 2019

2020s
List of Argentine films of 2020
List of Argentine films of 2021
List of Argentine films of 2022
List of Argentine films of 2023
List of Argentine films of 2024
List of Argentine films of 2025
List of Argentine films of 2026
List of Argentine films of 2027
List of Argentine films of 2028
List of Argentine films of 2029